Duncan John Browne (25 March 1947 – 28 May 1993) was an English singer-songwriter and musician. He is most remembered for his moderate hit single "Journey," which peaked at No. 23 in the U.K in 1972, and its corresponding 1973 album Duncan Browne, which has since garnered a cult status among fans of 1970s folk rock.

Early life 
Browne was born on 25 March 1947, the only child of Air Commodore C. D. A. Browne. He initially intended to follow his father into the Royal Air Force but was turned down on health grounds while at the Worksop College. At school he was a promising schoolboy actor and clarinetist.

Career
Browne attended the London Academy of Music and Dramatic Art, studying both music theory and drama. He chose to become a musician when, in 1967, he met Andrew Loog Oldham, and signed with his Immediate Records label. His debut album Give Me Take You was issued in 1968.

His choral arrangement was used on the Tim Hardin penned "Hang on to a Dream" on the album Nice, as recorded by The Nice in 1969.

Browne's biggest hit in the UK was the song "Journey" (UK number 23), and was as televised on Top of the Pops in 1972. The song was included on Browne's second album Duncan Browne in 1973.

In the 1970s, Browne formed the band Metro with Peter Godwin and released some records in the US on the Sire label. He released two solo albums: The Wild Places and Streets of Fire. The song "The Wild Places" was a hit single in the Netherlands. From the same period, "Criminal World", co-written by Browne with Peter Godwin, was recorded by David Bowie on his 1983 Let's Dance album.

In 1984–85 Browne composed and performed the music for the British television series Travelling Man, in collaboration with the programme's producer Sebastian Graham-Jones. The soundtrack was released on vinyl and CD. The track reached number 68 in the UK Singles Chart in December 1984.

Browne also composed "Salva Me", the theme tune of the BBC series Shadow of the Noose in 1989, and it appeared on a compilation album with 19 other television theme tunes.

In 1989 Browne was diagnosed with cancer, and while initial treatment appeared to be successful, the disease returned a few years later and he died in 1993 aged 46. At the time of his death Browne was in the middle of making a new solo album. After his death friends and colleagues, including Sebastian Graham-Jones, decided to finish this production posthumously, with Nick Magnus as the principal caretaker of this project. The resulting album, Songs of Love & War was released in 1995 and was described as "a fine album exploring pretty much the same musical universe as Browne's solo productions from the late 70's."

Discography

Studio albums
 Give Me Take You  (1968)
 Duncan Browne (1973)
 The Wild Places (1978)
 Streets of Fire (1979)
 Songs of Love & War (1995)

Singles
 "On the Bombsite" / "Alfred Bell" (1968)
 "Who Is Julie" (1969)
 "Resurrection Joe" / "The Final Asylum" (1970)
 "Journey" / "In a Mist" (1972)
 "Send Me the Bill for Your Friendship" / "My Only Son" (1973)
 "The Wild Places" / "Camino Real (Parts 2 & 3)" (1978)
 "American Heartbeat" / "(Restless) Child of Change" (1979)
 "American Heartbeat" / "She's Just a Fallen Angel" (1979)
 "Fauvette" / "Streets of Fire (Extract)" (1979)
 "Niña morena" / "Fauvette" (1979)
 "Theme From Travelling Man" / "Andrea's Theme" (1984)
 "The Wild Places '91" / "Fauvette" (1991)

Compilation albums
 Compilation (1982)
 Planet Earth (1986)
 Selection (1991)
 The Wild Places / Streets of Fire (2000)
 Journey: The Anthology 1967–1993 (2004)
 Best of Duncan Browne : Greatest Hits (2004)

Soundtracks
 Travelling Man – The Music from the Granada TV series (1985)

References

External links
 Duncan Browne Tribute
[ Duncan Browne biography] at Allmusic website

1947 births
1993 deaths
English male singer-songwriters
English rock singers
Deaths from cancer in the United Kingdom
Rak Records artists
Immediate Records artists
Sire Records artists
20th-century English singers
20th-century British male singers